Amanaki Lotoahea (born 14 April 1990) is a Tongan-born Japanese rugby union footballer who plays as either a fullback or a wing.

Lotoahea currently plays for the Ricoh Black Rams having joined them in 2014. He was initially named in the first ever  squad to compete in Super Rugby from the 2016 season, but was later dropped from the squad after sustaining an injury.

References

External links 
 

1990 births
Living people
Tongan rugby union players
Tongan expatriate rugby union players
Tongan expatriate sportspeople in Japan
Expatriate rugby union players in Japan
Rugby union fullbacks
Rugby union wings
Black Rams Tokyo players
Male rugby sevens players
Sunwolves players
Japanese rugby union players
Japan international rugby union players